This is a list of the complete operas of the French opera composer Adolphe Adam (1803–1856). Unless otherwise noted, all premieres took place in Paris.

Best known for his opéras comiques, of which he wrote 36, Adam actually began his career with a series of 19 vaudevilles. He also composed three opéras, two opérettes, two pasticcios, one drame lyrique, one opéra-ballet and one scène-prologue, in addition to works variously designated as drama, drama with songs, historical melodrama and military spectacle.

List

References
Notes

Sources
 Forbes, Elizabeth (1992), 'Adam, Adolphe' in The New Grove Dictionary of Opera, ed. Stanley Sadie. London: Macmillan. .
 Walsh, T. J. (1981). Second Empire Opera: The Théâtre Lyrique, 1851–1870. London: John Calder. .
 Warrack, John and West, Ewan (1992), The Oxford Dictionary of Opera. Oxford: Oxford University Press. .
 Wild, Nicole; Charlton, David (2005). Théâtre de l'Opéra-Comique Paris: répertoire 1762-1972. Sprimont, Belgium: Editions Mardaga. .
Some of the information in this article is taken from the related German Wikipedia article.

 
Lists of operas by composer
Lists of compositions by composer